Alamo City Rollergirls or ACRG, is a women's flat-track roller derby league based in San Antonio, Texas. Founded in 2005, the league played their fourth season in 2010. The ACRG are a founding member of the Women's Flat Track Derby Association (WFTDA).

Teams
Alamo City currently has 4 home teams in the league, the Bradley Bombshells, Las Luchadoras, Mustang Sallies, and Las Estrellas. Alamo City operates a training program called "Asphalt Assault", an eight-week program that gets neophyte skaters up to speed.

WFTDA competition
ACRG league has two travel teams: Las Tejanas (WFTDA A-Team), Las Pistoleras (B-team).

Rankings

References

External links
 ACRG Official Website

2006 establishments in Texas
Roller derby leagues established in 2006
Roller derby leagues in Texas
Sports in San Antonio
Women's Flat Track Derby Association Division 3
Women's sports in the United States
Women's sports in Texas